In British politics, Brownism is the political ideology of the former Prime Minister and leader of the Labour Party Gordon Brown and those that follow him. Proponents of Brownism are referred to as Brownites.

Ideology 
In an opiniated article, Anthony Giddens claimed that in contrast to Blairite, the adjective used to refer to the political ideology of Tony Blair, Brownites tend to be less enthusiastic about market driven reforms such as tuition fees and foundation hospitals and more keen on the role of the state, less critical of Labour's links to the unions and critical of media management techniques such as the use of spin doctors. Will Hutton opined: "Like Tony Blair [Gordon Brown] is a believer in a pluralist and fair society, social mobility, and marrying economic efficiency with social justice".

Relationship to prior administrations 

Gordon Brown succeeded Blair as Prime Minister after Brown's long tenure as the Chancellor of the Exchequer. Although viewed in the media as somewhat personally close, Blair later wrote in his autobiography A Journey that a "maddening" Brown effectively blackmailed him while he was in 10 Downing Street. Blair accused Brown of orchestrating the investigation into the Cash-for-Honours scandal and stated that the personal animosity was so strong that it led him to frequent drinking, a big change for Blair. Blair also has told journalist Andrew Marr that as their years working together went on, co-operation became "hard going on impossible".

As stated before, both men had similar positions on actual issues and government policies. To the extent that they felt divided, it came mostly from differences in personality, background and managing style.

Brownites 
Other than Brown himself, the following prominent Labour politicians are often considered Brownites, but may not identify themselves as such:

 Douglas Alexander – former Secretary of State for International Development and Shadow Foreign Secretary
 Ian Austin – former Minister for the West Midlands
 Ed Balls – former Shadow Chancellor of the Exchequer and Secretary of State for Children, Schools and Families
 Nick Brown – former Opposition Chief Whip and Minister for the North East
 Tom Clarke – former Minister of State for Film and Tourism
 Yvette Cooper - Shadow Home Secretary and former Work and Pensions Secretary
 Alistair Darling – former Chancellor of the Exchequer
 Donald Dewar – former First Minister of Scotland and former Leader of the Scottish Labour Party
 Michael Dugher – former Shadow Secretary of State for Culture, Media and Sport
 Nigel Griffiths – former Deputy Leader of the House of Commons
 Kevan Jones – former Shadow Minister for the Armed Forces
 Jim Knight – former Minister of State for Employment and Welfare Reform and Minister for the South West
 Spencer Livermore – Member of the House of Lords
 Tony Lloyd – former Shadow Secretary of State for Northern Ireland
 Damian McBride – former Downing Street Press Secretary
 Kerry McCarthy – former Shadow Secretary of State for Environment, Food and Rural Affairs
 Ed Miliband – Shadow Secretary of State for Business, Energy and Industrial Strategy and former Leader of the Labour Party
 Sue Nye – Member of the House of Lords
 Rachel Reeves – Shadow Chancellor of the Exchequer
 Anas Sarwar – Leader of the Scottish Labour Party
 Siôn Simon – former MP for Birmingham Erdington
 Andrew Smith – former Secretary of State for Work and Pensions and Chief Secretary to the Treasury
 Shriti Vadera – former Parliamentary Under-Secretary of State for Business, Innovation and Skills
 Emily Thornberry – Shadow Attorney General and former Shadow Foreign Secretary
 Charlie Whelan – former political director of the British trade union, Unite the Union
 Tom Watson –  former Chair and Deputy Leader of the Labour Party

See also 
 Blairism
 Blair–Brown deal

References 

Politics of the United Kingdom
Gordon Brown
Eponymous political ideologies
New Labour
Political party factions in the United Kingdom
Labour Party (UK) factions